Psilalcis nigrifasciata is a moth in the family Geometridae. It is found in Taiwan

References

Moths described in 1912
Boarmiini